Jeff 'J.D.' Pinkus is an American bassist best known for his work with American punk band Butthole Surfers from 1985 to 1994 and the 2009 reunion.

In 1990, he and Butthole Surfers' lead vocalist Gibby Haynes released Digital Dump, the only album from their psychedelic house music side project The Jackofficers.

Upon leaving Butthole Surfers, Pinkus worked full-time with the Austin trio Daddy Longhead, which he had assembled during his waning months in the band, and which included longtime Atlanta associate Jimbo Young on guitar and Rey Washam on drums.  Daddy Longhead retired after 10 years, leaving Pinkus free to explore other projects including Skinny Leonard and Areola 51. Pinkus played with Helios Creed on his albums NUGG: The Transport and Activated Condition, and has also collaborated with Bad Livers frontman Danny Barnes several times in a live setting.

He currently leads Honky and as of January 2008 plays weekly on Monday nights at the Jackalope, in Austin, Texas, with an assortment of other musicians called the Guit Down Syndrome.

Pinkus also performs with Pure Luck, who released a self-titled release in 2017 on Heavy Feather Records. He leaves his bass to play banjo and guitar in this project.

On their 30th anniversary tour in 2013, Pinkus joined Melvins in place of Jared Warren (on paternity leave) as well as performing with the opening Honky. He subsequently joined the Melvins full-time, touring with them in 2014 in support of the album Hold It In, which also featured Butthole Surfers founder Paul Leary, and again in 2015. He also plays on the song "Captain Come Down" which was first released in 2015 on Chaos as Usual, a split release with Le Butcherettes, and later included on the 2016 album Basses Loaded.

In 2018, J.D. Pinkus released a solo album, Keep on the Grass on Cassette tape on Minner Bucket Records and compact disc on Heavy Feather Records. It was recorded entirely on banjo and features a rendition of the song "Bride of Crankenstein" from the Melvins album Hold It In. The CD release show with Sleep in San Pedro was on September 15, 2018. The b-side "11:11" was used on the Coup Sur Coup Records Various Artists compilation Feedback Through A Magnifying Glass Volume I in 2018.

On February 12, 2018, the Melvins announced that Pinkus would be joining them, alongside current bassist Steven McDonald (Redd Kross), on their next album and subsequent tour. Released on April 20, 2018, the aptly titled Pinkus Abortion Technician features both bass players and four songs written or co-written by Pinkus.

On August 20, 2021, JD Pinkus released "Fungus Shui" through Shimmy Disc which was his second solo banjo album.

On August 27, 2021, the band Tiny Tree released "XI" and JD Pinkus performed on the track titled "December" through the label Onama Media Group.

Select discography

Butthole Surfers
1987 – Locust Abortion Technician
1988 – Hairway to Steven
1989 – Double Live
1989 – Widowermaker (EP)
1991 – piouhgd
1993 – Independent Worm Saloon

Daddy Longhead
1991 – Cheatos
1997 – Supermasonic
1998 – Classic
2021 - Twinkle

Areola 51
1999 - Self-Tittled
2004 - The Double-D sides
2015 - Live-2005

Honky
1998 – Honky
2001 – House of Good Tires
2005 – Balls Out Inn
2012 – 421
2016 – Corduroy

Melvins
2014 – Hold It In
2016 – Basses Loaded (on the song "Captain Come Down")
2018 – Pinkus Abortion Technician

Pure Luck
2017 - Pure Luck

Tiny Tree
 2021 - XI

Solo 
 2018 - Keep on the Grass (Minner Bucket/Heavy Feather)
 2018 - V/A Feedback Through A Magnifying Glass Volume I (song "11:11", Coup Sur Coup Records)
 2021 - Fungus Shui (Heavy Feather/Shimmy Disc)

References

External links
 JD Pinkus Official Website
 
 Areola 51 on MAXBRODYWORLD.COM/bandcamp

Butthole Surfers members
American rock bass guitarists
American male bass guitarists
Living people
1967 births
Musicians from Austin, Texas
Hardcore punk musicians
Noise rock musicians
Guitarists from Texas
American male guitarists
Melvins members
Coup Sur Coup Records artists